BQ-123, also known as cyclo(-D-Trp-D-Asp-Pro-D-Val-Leu-), is a cyclic pentapeptide that was first isolated from a fermentation broth of Streptomyces misakiensis in 1991. NMR studies indicate that the polypeptide backbone consists of a type II beta turn and an inverse gamma turn. The side-chains adopt different orientations depending on the solvent used. The proline carbonyl oxygen atom located at the onset of a beta turn is a sodium ion binding site. It has a high affinity for sodium ions and can coordinate up to three of them. Studies have shown that BQ123 is effective in reversing Ischemia-induced acute renal failure, and it has been suggested that this might be because BQ123 increases reabsorption of sodium ions in the proximal tubule cells.

BQ-123 is a selective ETA endothelin receptor antagonist.  As such, it is used as a biochemical tool in the study of endothelin receptor function. BQ-123 works as an ET-1 antagonist by reversing already established contractions to ET-1. This indicates that BQ-123 can work as an antagonist to remove ET-1 from its receptor (ETA).

References 

Heterocyclic compounds with 1 ring
Endothelin receptor antagonists
Cyclic peptides
Pentapeptides